The Puerto Rico Academy of Arts and Sciences is a decades-old non-profit institution created for the advancement of knowledge in the Commonwealth of Puerto Rico.  The Academy has published many books and produces a journal titled "Revista de la Academia de Artes y Ciencias de Puerto Rico"

References

Educational organizations based in Puerto Rico
Scientific societies based in Puerto Rico